The Higher Committee of Human Fraternity (HCHF) is an independent body of world religious, academic and cultural leaders created on 19 August 2019 based on the Document on Human Fraternity signed by the Pope Francis and Ahmed el-Tayed. The aim of the committee is to implement the purposes set out in the Document on Human Fraternity at the international level.

Members

References 

International organizations
Organizations established in 2019